Sacred Heart School is a private elementary and secondary school in Sedalia, Missouri, providing education for grades Kindergarten through 12th grade.  It is a Roman Catholic school, affiliated with the Sacred Heart Church Parish in the Roman Catholic Diocese of Jefferson City.

Background
The school was founded in 1882 and enrollment is approximately 400 students.  Student to teacher ratios range from 13.4 to 1 in the secondary school to 20 to 1 in the elementary grades.

The school mascot is the Gremlin, with team colors of red and white.

Athletics
Sacred Heart won the State Championship in 2014 in Boys' Basketball. They have also won 2 State Championships in Volleyball and 3 in Boys' Golf. In 2006, they also won the State Championship in Baseball. They are a part of the Kaysinger Conference.

Notes and references

External links
 School Website

Roman Catholic Diocese of Jefferson City
Catholic secondary schools in Missouri
Educational institutions established in 1882
Schools in Pettis County, Missouri
Private middle schools in Missouri
Private elementary schools in South Carolina
1882 establishments in Missouri